Onyegbule is a surname. Notable people with the surname include:

 Chigozirim Onyegbule, Nigerian Anglican bishop
 Lovina Onyegbule, Nigerian athlete

Surnames of Nigerian origin